Nicolas Felizola begun his career as a fashion photographer. Felizola worked as a photographer for fashion designers such as Alexander McQueen and the House of Givenchy. As an international Fashion Designer Felizola has been awarded and recognized multiple times, such as the "Certificate of Special Congressional Recognition (2012) by members of congress of the United States of America, "Personality of The Year Award" (2012) by Opi at the Unesco, Paris, France, "Best Designer of Miami Fashion Week," and Miami Fashion Icon award presented by Tiffany & Co. for his Prive evening gown and Uomo collections; the "Zanetti Murano Award" in Italy; the "Universal Excellence Award." Recipient of the city of Miami key 2018 and most recently honored with his official day on May 9, 2018 by City of Doral, Florida. Among other important careers recognitions. Felizola was featured in Forbes as "America's Young Fashion Designer," recognized among ten Hispanic Designers that are influential in the United States, such as Carolina Herrera and Oscar de la Renta. His vision, passion and devotion for the art of creation, makes him look forward, to achieve excellency in every step of his journey. As he says "I do not believe in fashion, I believe in expressing your unique sense of style through what you choose to wear for any occasion."

Collections

Felizola, as a designer, has produced the following collections:
 Vibrations Fashion performance At Adrienne Arsht Center for the Performing Arts in 2015
 Felizola Privè 2014
 Felizola Resort 2014 and Men's Underwear line "Felizolaunderworld"
 MOOI (Inspired by Rembrandt and Vermeer) in 2013
 Cinetique (Inspired by Kinetic Movement) in 2012
 Orinokia (Inspired by the Orinoco River) in 2011
 Seductrice in 2010
 Enamorada (Spanish for "In Love") in 2009
 Del Cuore (Italian for "Of The Heart") in 2008

2015 Vibrations 
This collection was inspired by the magic of music with fashion design. The event was held at the Adrienne Arsht Center for the Performing Arts in the city of Miami. The music portion of this beautiful evening was led by the Miami Symphony Orchestra.

2014 Privè

2013 MOOI
Mooi is Felizola's latest collection inspired by Rembrandt and Vermeer. These 17th-century Dutch painter's contributions to art came in a period that historians called the Dutch Golden Age. The result was richly varied handling of paint and deep layers.

2012 Cinetique
Reverence to the world of kinetic movement originated in Paris by great teachers of their time, such as Carlos Cruz Diez and Jesus Soto. They served as foundation and inspiration to Nicolas Felizola. Conceptualizing in their different facets as the artist of the photographic lens, of fashion couture and unique decorative pieces for the home, Felizola offers us his version of the Kinetic movement for the 21st century. Cinetique transports us with its encircling magic lines fused in a focal point to emphasize the delicate female silhouette.

2011 Orinokia
Nicolas Felizola Spring Summer 2011 was Orinokia.  The legends of El Dorado the city of gold and the Orinoco River have brought forward myths and fantasy that have outlasted the clutches of time.

2010 Seductrice

Inspired by the fearless power of seduction of today's modern woman. This collection was held at Miami Fashion Week 2010 (Closing Ceremony).

2009 Enamorada
In 2009, Felizola released his new spring/summer collection titled Enamorada. Felizola took inspiration on the 1950s Mexican star María Félix.
The designer said about this collection:
 "Maria was in love with fashion. She understood that the art of dressing required, like every master's work, unavoidable steps to reach perfection. The cuts and lines that emphasized her waistline and accentuated her silhouette were her trademarks, just like the colors and richness of the garments' textures. Coming into the present time, fine silk gazaar feathers cut in a laborious maneuver, just like flares, embroidery, beading, pleats, French Chantilly lace, and the most exquisite silks embody this collection."

2008 Del Cuore
Felizola debuted his Spring/Summer 2008 collection at New York Fashion Week 2008 during a charity luncheon benefiting the AROD Family Foundation, hosted by baseball player of the year, Alex Rodriguez and his wife, Cynthia. When asked about this collection, Felizola said:
 "Del Cuore is about the passion of the heart, and this collection is purely from the heart and completely about the passion that a woman has."

Awards and merits 
 2019 Talenpro -Audiovisual's Arts -judge.Panama City -Panama 
 2019 30 years trajectory -Nicolas Felizola - couture fashion Show -Big brothers big Sisters.Ritz Carlton -key Biscayne. 
 2018 NicolasFelizola-oficial day may 9 -proclamation by the mayor of the city of Doral-fl Juan carlos bermudez
 2018 Evtv recognition as Orgullo Venezolano-Venezuelan Pride award.

 2017 – "Chiaroscuro Studio Award" – Given to Nicolas Felizola for his contributions to the arts in the United States. Miami FL.
 2016 – Mayor Tomas Regalado presented the "Key to the City of Miami" to Venezuelan Photographer, Fashion Designer, and Attorney at Law Nicolas Felizola. Miami, Florida.
 2016 – Mercedes-Benz Fashion Week Santo Domingo 2016 – " Nicolas Felizola Prive Collection." Santo Domingo, Dominican Republic.
 2016 – Puerto Rico Fashion "Nicolas Felizola Vibrations." San Juan, Puerto Rico.
 2016 – "Miami Life Achievement Award" For his contributions to the fashion industry and for his philanthropic work in Miami and around the world. Miami, Florida.
 2016 – Awarded  "The Princess Grace of Monaco Award" by the Foundation Grace of Monaco.  New York. 
 2016 Cine Argentino award - Presented by Adriana Bianco.
 2016 Mercy Hospital Auxiliary Award.Miami Fl
2016 excellence award achievement by Miami life awards 2016 
 2015 – MISO CHIC Nicolas Felizola "Fashion Show Vibrations" At Adrienne Arsht Center Miami, Florida.
 2015 – Miami Life Awards  " Designer of the Year." Miami FL.
 2014 – Miami Fashion Week 2014 "Resort Collection." Miami Beach, Florida.
 2013 Icon of style Award- New York City -by Vanidades-Editorial Televisa
 2013 – excellence in evening-wear Awards   "Miami Fashion Week 2013", Miami Beach FL 
2013 Miami Fashion Icon Award- by Miami Fashion week -Tiffany&co Award.
 2013 – PGA (Professional Golfers Association) World Golf Championship, Doral, Florida
 2013 Golden Smile's Award .Presented by American developing Smiles Foundation.
 2013 Icono -Lasta Award -highest fashion show of the world -Salar of Uyuni -Bolivia.
 2012 congressional medal of Merit.presented by Member of congress of United States ofAmerica .washintong Dc.
 2012 The flag of the United States of America. Washington DC 
 2012 Best Fashion Entrepreneur of the Year Award .presented by EmprenDT Latino.
 2012 – "BeLive for Colombia, Fashion Show." Miami, Florida
 2012 -" Caribbean Fashion Week," Santo Domingo, Dominican Republic
 2012 – "Miami Beach International Fashion Week 2012," Miami Beach, Fl
 2012 victoria Puig de Lange -International Style excellence Award-Miami Fashion Week .Presented by Tiffany &co
 2012 Iberoamerican Personality of the year.presented by OPI -Unesco-Paris France.
 2011 – "Noche Romántica Fundación San Felipe," Panamá, Republic of Panama
 2011 – "Miami Fashion Week,"  Miami FL
 2010 – "Orinokia Nicolas Felizola Prive 2011," Miami, Florida
 2010 – "República Dominicana Fashion Week," Santo Domingo, Dominican Republic
 2010 – Designers Choice Award "Miami International Fashion Week ." Miami, Florida by Tiffany & co 
 2010 Mens style Award- Miami Fashion Week presented by Tiffany &co .
 2010 – "María Félix Exhibition," Bellas Artes Theater-Santo Domingo, Dominican Republic.
 2010 The Miami Dade county office of the Mayor and board of county Commissioners Recognition-As Internacional Fashion Designer-Presented by Mayor Carlos Alvarez
 2009 – "Vanidades de la Moda" 
 2009 – "Noche de Estrellas." DF, Mexico
 2009 – "High Fashion Palm Beach," Palm Beach, Florida
 2009 – "Miami Fashion Week 2009," Miami, Florida
 2008 – "Enamorada Fashion Show CIFO Museum." Miami, Florida
 2008 – "María Félix Exhibition," Miami FL
 2008 – "Acapulco Fashion "Novias Felizola," Acapulco, Mexico
 2008 – "Miami Fashion Week 2008," Miami FL
 2008 – "Vanidades Fashion Show", Miami, Florida
 2007 -"Harpers Bazaar Magia de Moda" Miami, Florida
 2007 – "DFashion Fashion Week." Mexico, DF
 2007 – "A Rod Family Foundation Fashion Show," New York NY
 2007 – "Pasarella Fashion Night "Modama" Guadalajara, Mexico 
 2007 – "Miracle Makers Big Brother Big Sister." Miami, Florida
 2007 – "Miami Fashion Week Miami Showcase." Miami, Fl
 2007 – "Cosmolounge," San Juan, Puerto Rico
 2016 Excellency Award-Mexico Df 
 2006 – "Love at First Sight, Ocean Drive." Miami, Florida
 2006 – "Haper's Bazaar Magia de Moda." Miami, Florida
 2006 – "MS Fashion Show," Tampa, Florida
 2006 – "Semana de la Moda 2006," Caracas, Venezuela
 2006 – "Lanzamiento Revista Nueva," San José, Costa Rica"
 2006 – "Managua Big Fashion Nicaragua" Managua, Nicaragua
 2006 – "Miami Fashion Week 2006," Miami, Florida
 2005 – "Acapulco Fashion Week, Acapulco Mexico"
 2005 – "Caras Fashion Show" Guayaquil Quito, Ecuador 
 2005 – "10 Years of Beauty and Fashion" Nicaragua
 2005 – "Operation Smile, Los Angeles, California"
 2005 – "Belleza Por Una Causa, Santo Domingo, Dominican Republic"
 2005 – Red Carpet International. San Juan Puerto Rico
 2005 – Miami Fashion Week (Best Designer Award)
 2004 – "Corazones de la Moda, Miami FL"
 2003 – Piel Miami Fl.
 2003 – "Dias de Moda", Ciudad Panamá, Panamá

References

External links 
 nicolasfelizola.com

1965 births
Living people
People from Valle de la Pascua
Venezuelan fashion designers